Hassānīya (also known as , , , , and Maure) is a variety of Maghrebi Arabic spoken by Mauritanian Arabs and the Sahrawi. It was spoken by the Beni Ḥassān Bedouin tribes, who extended their authority over most of Mauritania and Morocco's southeastern and Western Sahara between the 15th and 17th centuries. Hassānīya Arabic was the language spoken in the pre-modern region around Chinguetti.

The language has completely replaced the Berber languages that were originally spoken in this region. Although clearly a western dialect, Hassānīya is relatively distant from other Maghrebi variants of Arabic. Its geographical location exposed it to influence from Zenaga-Berber and Wolof. There are several dialects of Hassānīya, which differ primarily phonetically. Today, Hassānīya is spoken in Algeria, Libya, Morocco, Mauritania, Mali, Niger, Senegal and the Western Sahara.

Phonology

The phonological system of Hassānīya is both very innovative and very conservative. All phonemes of Classical Arabic are represented in the dialect, but there are also many new phonemes. As in other Bedouin dialects, Classical /q/ corresponds mostly to dialectal ;  and  have merged into ; and the interdentals  and  have been preserved.

However, there is sometimes a double correspondence of a classical sound and its dialectal counterpart. Similarly,  becomes  in  'laugh (noun)', but  in  'to be sick'. Some consonant roots even have a double appearance:  'heavy (mentally)' vs.  'heavy (materially)'. Some of the "classicizing" forms are easily explained as recent loans from the literary language (such as  'law') or from sedentary dialects in case of concepts pertaining to the sedentary way of life (such as  'scissors' above). For others, there is no obvious explanation (like  'to be sick').

In some literary terms, however, it is clearly preserved:  'suffering (participle)' (classical ).

Consonants 

Hassānīya has innovated many consonants by the spread of the distinction emphatic/non-emphatic. In addition to the above-mentioned,  and  have a clear phonemic status and  more marginally so. One additional emphatic phoneme  is acquired from the neighbouring Zenaga Berber language along with a whole palatal series  from Niger–Congo languages of the south. At least some speakers make the distinction /p/–/b/ through borrowings from French (and Spanish in Western Sahara). All in all, the number of consonant phonemes in Hassānīya is 31, or 43 counting the marginal cases.

In geminated and word-final positions both phonemes are voiceless, for some speakers /θ/ apparently in all positions. The uvular fricative  is likewise realised voiceless in a geminated position, although not fricative but plosive: .

Vowels 

Vowel phonemes come in two series: long and short. The long vowels are the same as in Classical Arabic , and the short ones extend this by one: .

As in most Maghrebi Arabic dialects, etymological short vowels are generally dropped in open syllables (except for the feminine noun ending ):  >  'you (f. sg.) write',  >  >  'he wrote'. In the remaining closed syllables dialectal /a/ generally corresponds to classical , while classical  and  have merged into . 'I wrote', root k-t-b),  'he descends' (subject prefix i-; cf. 'he writes', subject prefix jə-). In some contexts this initial vowel even gets lengthened, which clearly demonstrates its phonological status of a vowel:  'they stood up'. 'he met').

Code-switching

Many educated Hassaniya Arabic speakers also practice code-switching. In Western Sahara it is common for code-switching to occur between Hassaniya Arabic, Modern Standard Arabic, and Spanish, as Spain had previously controlled this region; in the rest of Hassaniya-speaking lands, French is the additional language spoken.

Writing system
Hassaniya Arabic is normally written with an Arabic script. However, in Senegal, the government has adopted the use of the Latin script to write the language, as established by Decree 2005–980 of October 21, 2005.

Speakers distribution
According to Ethnologue, there are approximately three million Hassaniya speakers, distributed as follows:

 Mauritania: 2,770,000 (2006)
 Western Sahara and the southern area of Morocco, known as the Tekna zone: 200,000+ (1995)
 Mali: 175,800 – 210,000 (2000)
 Algeria: 150,000 (1985)
 Libya: 40,000 (1985)
 Niger: 10,000 (1998)

See also

Varieties of Arabic
Nemadi dialect
Imraguen people

References

 
 "Hassaniya, the Arabic of Mauritania", Al-Any, Riyadh S. / In: Linguistics; vol. 52 (1969), pag. 15 / 1969 	
 "Hassaniya, the Arabic of Mauritania", Al-Any, Riyadh S. / In: Studies in linguistics; vol. 19 (1968), afl. 1 (mrt), pag. 19 / 1968
 "Hassaniya Arabic (Mali) : Poetic and Ethnographic Texts", Heath, Jeffrey; Kaye, Alan S. / In: Journal of Near Eastern studies; vol. 65 (2006), afl. 3, pag. 218 (1) / 2006
 Hassaniya Arabic (Mali) : poetic and ethnographic texts, Heath, Jeffrey / Harrassowitz / 2003
 Hassaniya Arabic (Mali) – English – French dictionary, Heath, Jeffrey / Harrassowitz / 2004
Taine-Cheikh, Catherine. 2006. Ḥassāniya Arabic. In Kees Versteegh (ed.), Encyclopedia of Arabic Language and Linguistics, 240–250. Leiden: E.~J.~Brill.

External links

Hassaniya Arabic at Omniglot

Arabic languages
Languages of Algeria
Languages of Mali
Languages of Mauritania
Languages of Niger
Languages of Western Sahara
Languages written in Latin script
Maghrebi Arabic
Sahrawi culture